Ricky Taylor (born August 3, 1989) is an American racing driver, most notably in the IMSA WeatherTech SportsCar Championship. His career highlights include an IMSA Series Championship in 2017, as well as marquee wins at the Daytona 24, 12 Hours of Sebring and Petit Le Mans.

In 2017, he, along with his brother Jordan, won the 2017 WeatherTech SportsCar Championship in the Prototype class with 5 wins.

In 2018, Ricky left his father's team, Wayne Taylor Racing, to join the new Acura Team Penske Prototype squad in 2018 WeatherTech SportsCar Championship, partnering with Hélio Castroneves for the full season. In 2020 he and codriver Castroneves won the 2020 WeatherTech SportsCar Championship. He returned to his father's team in 2021.

Ricky was also runner-up of GRAND-AM Rolex Sports Car Series Daytona Prototype class in 2010 and 2011. Within that category, he earned seven wins and 20 podiums. He was also second in the 2014 24 Hours of Daytona and fifth in 2008, 2011 and 2013.

Early years
His father, Wayne Taylor, was driver of IMSA GT Championship in the 1990s, so his brother Ricky and Jordan Taylor grew up in Florida (USA). After competing in karting, Ricky was series champion of single seaters' school Skip Barber Southern in 2006 and runner-up of Skip Barber National in 2007.

In 2008, Taylor debuted in the 24 Hours of Daytona for the Grand-Am series with a Riley-Pontiac of Daytona Prototype class of Wayne Taylor Racing, resulting fifth with Max Angelelli, Michael Valiante and his father Wayne Taylor. Months later, contested  the round of Virginia with the Beyer's team, accompanied by Andy Wallace and Jared Beyer. Later, Ricky joined to Doran's team to participate in the final six races of the season with a Dallara-Ford, earning a fifth place with Burt Frisselle like best result.

Ricky became in regular driver of Beyer in the 2009 season of the Grand-Am series, using first a Riley-Pontiac and then a  Riley-Chevrolet. He earned a fourth place, an eighth and a ninth in the last three races so that finished 18th in the drivers' championship in the Daytona Prototype class.

WTR and Spirit of Daytona
Wayne Taylor hired  Ricky to contest the 2010 Rolex Sports Car Series with a Dallara-Ford. Accompanied by Max Angelelli, the driver captured one win and seven podiums and sixth place in the 24 Hours of Daytona. Thus, he was second in the drivers' championships and teams in the DP class, behind Scott Pruett and Memo Rojas and his nine victories.

In the 2011 Rolex Sports Car Series season, now at the wheel of a Dallara-Chevrolet. Scored three victories (one of them in the 6 Hours of Watkins Glen) and eight podium finishes and a fifth place in the 24 Hours of Daytona. As a consequence, was runner-up in the DP class behind Pruett and Rojas again.

Adopting the new Chevrolet Corvette DP in 2012, Taylor recorded three wins and seven top 5 in 12 appearances. Thus ended seventh in the driver standings and fifth in the teams in the DP class. Later, he contested the Gold Coast 600 of V8 Supercars in a Holden Commodore from Garry Rogers Motorsport alongside Greg Ritter, however he was sent into a frightening rollover several hundred metres after the start whilst trying to avoid two stricken cars.

Taylor became in driver of the Spirit of Daytona Racing for the 2013 Rolex Sports Car Series season, teaming with Richard Westbrook. He earned a third place, three-fifths and a sixth, so finished 11th in the drivers championship and eighth in teams in the DP. On the other hand, obtained a fifth place in the GTE-Am class at the 24 Hours of Le Mans, driving a Chevrolet Corvette of Larbre Competition.

Team Penske

Beginning with the 2018 Roar Before the 24, Ricky Taylor will partner Helio Castroneves in one of two new works Acura ARX-05 fielded by Roger Penske. Taylor and co-driver Castroneves won the 2020 WeatherTech SportsCar DPi Drivers' Championship, after finishing 8th, at the season finale at the 12 Hours of Sebring.

Other competition
In 2012, Taylor was selected by Garry Rogers Motorsport to participate in the 2012 Armor All Gold Coast 600 event for V8 Supercars as an 'international' co-driver. In his first ever standing start he managed 200m before he rolled off a car that had stalled on the grid, totalling his #33 Holden VE Commodore and resigning himself and team-mate Greg Ritter to the sidelines for the rest of the weekend.

Racing record

Complete 24 Hours of Le Mans results

‡13th in LMP2. Fourth in LMP2 Pro-Am.

Complete IMSA SportsCar Championship results
(key)(Races in bold indicate pole position)

Complete European Le Mans Series results
(key) (Races in bold indicate pole position; results in italics indicate fastest lap)

Complete FIA World Endurance Championship results
(key) (Races in bold indicate pole position) (Races in italics indicate fastest lap)

External links

 Ricky Taylor in Racing Reference
 Ricky Taylor in Driver Database
 Ricky Taylor in Race Database

1989 births
Living people
24 Hours of Daytona drivers
Rolex Sports Car Series drivers
FIA World Endurance Championship drivers
24 Hours of Le Mans drivers
Supercars Championship drivers
Indy Pro 2000 Championship drivers
People from Surrey
WeatherTech SportsCar Championship drivers
12 Hours of Sebring drivers
Team Penske drivers
American people of South African descent
Corvette Racing drivers
Larbre Compétition drivers
Wayne Taylor Racing drivers
DragonSpeed drivers
European Le Mans Series drivers
Jota Sport drivers
Garry Rogers Motorsport drivers
Andretti Autosport drivers